The 2015 Copa Libertadores de América (officially the 2015 Copa Bridgestone Libertadores for sponsorship reasons) was the 56th edition of the Copa Libertadores de América, South America's premier club football tournament organized by CONMEBOL.

Argentine team River Plate qualified to play in the 2015 FIFA Club World Cup and the 2016 Recopa Sudamericana as the best-placed South American team, before winning the final against Mexican team UANL 3–0 on aggregate to win their third title. San Lorenzo were the defending champions, but they were eliminated in the group stage.

Teams
The following 38 teams from 11 associations (the 10 CONMEBOL members plus Mexico which were invited to compete) qualified for the tournament:
Title holders
Argentina and Brazil: 5 berths each
All other associations: 3 berths each

The entry stage is determined as follows:
Second stage: 26 teams (top four teams from Argentina and Brazil, and top two teams from all other associations)
First stage: 12 teams (team with the lowest berth from each association, plus team with the second lowest berth from association of title holders)

Draw

The draw of the tournament was held on December 2, 2014, at the CONMEBOL Convention Centre in Luque, Paraguay.

For the first stage, the 12 teams were drawn into six ties containing a team from Pot 1 and a team from Pot 2, with the former hosting the second leg. The seeding of each team was determined by which associations reached the furthest stage in the previous Copa Libertadores.

For the second stage, the 32 teams were drawn into eight groups of four containing one team from each of the four seeding pots. The seeding of each team was determined by their association and qualifying berth (as per the rotational agreement established by CONMEBOL, the teams which qualified through berths 1 from Colombia, Ecuador, Peru and Venezuela were seeded into Pot 1 for odd-numbered years, while the teams which qualified through berths 1 from Bolivia, Chile, Paraguay and Uruguay were seeded into Pot 1 for even-numbered years). Teams from the same association in Pots 1 and 2 could not be drawn into the same group. However, a first stage winner, whose identity was not known at the time of the draw, could be drawn into the same group with another team from the same association.

Schedule
The schedule of the competition was as follows (all dates listed were Wednesdays, but matches could also be played on Tuesdays and Thursdays as well). There was a two-month break between the quarterfinals and semifinals due to the 2015 Copa América.

Notes

First stage

In the first stage, each tie was played on a home-and-away two-legged basis. If tied on aggregate, the away goals rule would be used. If still tied, the penalty shoot-out would be used to determine the winner (no extra time would be played). The six winners of the first stage advanced to the second stage to join the 26 automatic qualifiers.

Second stage

In the second stage, each group was played on a home-and-away round-robin basis. The teams were ranked according to points (3 points for a win, 1 point for a draw, 0 points for a loss). If tied on points, tiebreakers were applied in the following order: 1. Goal difference; 2. Goals scored; 3. Away goals scored; 4. Drawing of lots. The winners and runners-up of each group advanced to the round of 16.

Group 1

Group 2

Group 3

Group 4

Group 5

Group 6

Group 7

Group 8

Final stages

In the final stages, the 16 teams played a single-elimination tournament, with the following rules:
Each tie was played on a home-and-away two-legged basis, with the higher-seeded team hosting the second leg. However, CONMEBOL required that the second leg of the finals had to be played in South America, i.e., if there was a finalist from Mexico, they would have to host the first leg regardless of seeding.
In the round of 16, quarterfinals, and semifinals, if tied on aggregate, the away goals rule would be used. If still tied, the penalty shoot-out would be used to determine the winner (no extra time would be played).
In the finals, if tied on aggregate, the away goals rule would not be used, and 30 minutes of extra time would be played. If still tied after extra time, the penalty shoot-out would be used to determine the winner.
If there were two semifinalists from the same association, they would have to play each other.

Seeding
The qualified teams were seeded in the final stages according to their results in the second stage, with the group winners seeded 1–8, and the group runners-up seeded 9–16.

Bracket

Round of 16

Notes

Quarterfinals

Semifinals

Finals

The finals were played on a home-and-away two-legged basis. If tied on aggregate, the away goals rule would not be used, and 30 minutes of extra time would be played. If still tied after extra time, the penalty shoot-out would be used to determine the winner.

Since UANL are not a South American club, by rule they had to host the first leg regardless of seeding.

Top goalscorers

See also
2015 FIFA Club World Cup
2015 Copa Sudamericana
2016 Recopa Sudamericana

References

External links

 
Copa Libertadores 2015, CONMEBOL.com 

 
2015
1